Jeanne St. Laurent (née Renault; October 22, 1886 – November 14, 1966) was the wife of Louis St. Laurent, the 12th Prime Minister of Canada.

Biography 
Renault was born in Beauceville, Quebec. Her parents were Pierre-Ferdinand Renault (1853–1912) and Amanda Montminy (1853–1922). Pierre-Ferdinand Renault was a Beauceville businessman (originally from Ste-Claire-de-Dorchester) and changed his family name from Renaud.

Renault met Louis St. Laurent at a party in Quebec City in 1906 while he was working as a lawyer, and they married in 1908. They had five children together, two sons and three daughters. In 1951, she moved the family to Ottawa, after the government purchased an official prime-ministerial residence at 24 Sussex Drive. She would tour with her husband, but she refused to fly and never became reconciled to living in Ottawa.

See also
Spouse of the prime minister of Canada

References

1886 births
1966 deaths
People from Chaudière-Appalaches
Spouses of prime ministers of Canada
French Quebecers